Reginald Ruffin is an American football coach and college athletics administrator. He is the head football coach and athletic director at Tuskegee University in Tuskegee, Alabama, a position he has held since December 2021. Ruffin served as the head football coach at Miles College in Fairfield, Alabama from 2011 to 2021.

Head coaching record

References

External links
 Miles profile

Year of birth missing (living people)
Living people
American football defensive ends
American football linebackers
North Alabama Lions football players
Miles Golden Bears football coaches
Tuskegee Golden Tigers athletic directors
Tuskegee Golden Tigers football coaches
African-American coaches of American football
African-American players of American football
African-American college athletic directors in the United States
21st-century African-American people